Coquitlam—Port Coquitlam is a federal electoral district in British Columbia. It encompasses a portion of the former electoral district of Port Moody—Westwood—Port Coquitlam.

Coquitlam—Port Coquitlam was created by the 2012 federal electoral boundaries redistribution and was legally defined in the 2013 representation order. It came into effect upon the call of the 2015 Canadian federal election, where Liberal MP Ron McKinnon won in the riding.

Demographics

Members of Parliament

This riding has elected the following members of the House of Commons of Canada:

Election results

Notes

References

British Columbia federal electoral districts
Federal electoral districts in Greater Vancouver and the Fraser Valley
Politics of Coquitlam
Port Coquitlam